The discography of Astrud Gilberto consists of sixteen studio albums and two live albums on Verve Records, CTI Records, Perception Records, Audio Fidelity Records, Denon Records, Polygram Records, Pony Canyon and Magya Productions, as well as one music DVD on Coqueiro Verde Records.

Discography

Albums

Compilations

 Compilations containing previously unreleased material.
 Compilations containing material previously unreleased on CD.

Singles

Extended plays

Guest appearances

 Awards of "Getz/Gilberto" album:
 Grammy Award for Album of the Year in 1965
 Grammy Award for Best Jazz Instrumental Album, Individual or Group in 1965
 Grammy Award for Best Engineered Album, Non-Classical in 1965
 One of 1001 Albums You Must Hear Before You Die
 Gold album

 Stan Getz "The Girl From Ipanema - The Bossa Nova Years" and Stan Getz, Joao Gilberto "Getz/Gilberto #2 (Live At Carnegie Hall)" recorded in the same concert. The first release contain only 3 tracks which were released both on vinyl and on cd; the second release contain five tracks which were released only on cd; that's why both releases are presented.

Various artists compilations

 Compilations containing previously unreleased material.
 Compilations containing previously unreleased on CD material.

Original recordings for motion picture soundtracks

Recordings for promotion

Unreleased songs

Remixed

 Released as Eden vs Astrud Gilberto.

Tributes

Videography

Video albums

DVDs with Astrud Gilberto appearance

Movies with Astrud Gilberto appearance

Music videos

References
General

Astrud Gilberto > Discography
 
 
 

Specific

External links
 Archived discography

Bossa nova discographies
Discographies of Brazilian artists
Vocal jazz discographies